Andrews High School or AHS is a public high school based in Andrews, Texas and classified as a 4A school by the UIL. It is a part of the Andrews Independent School District which serves all of Andrews County.

History 
In recent years, a new multi-use sports facility has been added which includes a swimming pool with a separate diving well, a basketball stadium, and a new performance center. AHS is further recognized to be an achieving academic school, with a variety of State Awards in UIL Accounting, Computer Applications, Lincoln-Douglas Debate, CX Debate, Computer Science, and UIL One Act Play.  In 2015, the school was rated "Met Standard" by the Texas Education Agency.

The school has an official National Forensics Association Charter, is an active National Speech and Debate school, and has regularly been noted in its state-ranking football team. The school also hosts a Aviation Academy which a four year program split between the high school and Guilford Technical Community College. A similar program is also in place to fast track a career in education with little or no debt. After graduation the students are committed to being a teacher at the school for at least three years.

In 2021, the high school playoff game between Andrews and Springtown was postponed after the Andrews High School marching band involved in a crash were three people died. The schools band director and the bus driver, a retired math teacher were both killed, along with the driver of the pickup that was going the wrong way before striking the bus.

Athletics
The Andrews Mustangs compete in these sports - 

Baseball
Basketball
Cross Country
Football
Golf
Powerlifting
Softball
Swimming
Tennis
Track and Field
Volleyball

State Titles
Band 2020
Baseball - 
1999(4A)
Boys Golf - 
1960(3A), 1987(4A), 1999(4A), 2013(3A), 2014(3A)
Girls Golf - 
1987(4A), 1989(4A), 1990(4A), 1991(4A), 1992(4A), 1996(4A), 2007(3A), 2008(3A), 2011(3A), 2012(3A), 2013(3A), 2014(3A), 2015(4A), 2016(4A), 2017(4A), 2018(4A), 2019(4A), 2021(4A)
Boys Track - 
1954(1A), 1958(2A), 1959(3A), 1960(3A), 1961(3A), 1981(4A)

Notable alumni
Chad Campbell, PGA
Max Lucado, author
Ted Nelson, Track and field coach Texas A&M University
C. Wesley Roberts, Texas State Representative
Shaud Williams, NFL

References

External links 
Andrews ISD
Greatschools.net profile Great Schools

Public high schools in Texas
Schools in Andrews County, Texas